Shuangqiao District is a district of Chengde, Hebei, China.

Administrative Divisions
Subdistricts:
Xida Avenue Subdistrict, Toudaopailou Subdistrict, Panjiagou Subdistrict, Zhonghua Road Subdistrict, Xinhua Road Subdistrict, Shidongzigou Subdistrict, Qiaodong Subdistrict

Towns:
Shuiquangou, Shizigou, Niuquanzigou, Dashimiao, Fengyingzi

References

External links

County-level divisions of Hebei
Chengde